Sumithra Warnakulasuriya (born 25 March 1962) is a former Sri Lankan cricketer.

Warnakulasuriya attended Royal College, Colombo from 1968 to 1982. In 1982 he was the school's head prefect and captain of the cricket team. In the 1980 Royal–Thomian match he scored 197, a record for the contest.

An opening batsman, he played 16 matches of first-class cricket for various Sri Lankan national teams between 1982 and 1986 but was unable to break into the Test team. His highest score was 174 not out off 419 balls for a Sri Lanka Colts XI against the touring Indian side in August 1985.

He later coached in Bangladesh before returning to Sri Lanka to coach the national under-19 team.

References

External links

1962 births
Living people
Sri Lankan cricketers
Alumni of Royal College, Colombo
Cricketers from Colombo
Sri Lankan cricket coaches